The 2008 Hokkaido Nippon-Ham Fighters season was the 63rd season of the Hokkaido Nippon-Ham Fighters franchise. The Fighters played the majority of their home games at Sapporo Dome in the city of Sapporo, as well as at Tokyo Dome in Tokyo as members of Nippon Professional Baseball's Pacific League. The team was led by Masataka Nashida on his first season as team manager. 

In the 2008 Pacific League Climax Series, the Fighters defeated the Orix Buffaloes in the First Stage, but were eliminated by the Saitama Seibu Lions in the Second Stage.

Regular season

Standings

Interleague

Record vs. opponents

Opening Day roster 
Thursday, March 20, 2008 vs. Chiba Lotte Marines

Game log

|-align="center" bgcolor="#bbffbb"
| 1 || March 20 || Marines || 1–0 || Darvish (1–0) || Kobayashi (0–1) || — || Sapporo Dome || 42,126 || 1–0–0 || W1
|-align="center" bgcolor="#ffbbbb"
| 2 || March 22 || Marines || 2–3 || Naruse (1–0) || Sakamoto (0–1) || — || Sapporo Dome || 31,028 || 1–1–0 || L1
|-align="center" bgcolor="#ffbbbb"
| 3 || March 23 || Marines || 1–4 || Watanabe (1–0) || Glynn (0–1) || Takagi (1) || Sapporo Dome || 32,215 || 1–2–0 || L2
|-align="center" bgcolor="#bbffbb"
| 4 || March 25 || Lions || 9–1 || Takeda (1–0) || Nishiguchi (0–1) || — || Sapporo Dome || 16,410 || 2–2–0 || W1
|-align="center" bgcolor="#ffbbbb"
| 5 || March 26 || Lions || 0–8 || Kishi (1–0) || Yoshikawa (0–1) || — || Sapporo Dome || 19,206 || 2–3–0 || L1
|-align="center" bgcolor="#bbffbb"
| 6 || March 27 || Lions || 1–0 (10) || Takeda (1–0) || Wakui (0–2) || — || Sapporo Dome || 25,011 || 3–3–0 || W1
|-align="center" bgcolor="#ffbbbb"
| 7 || March 29 || @ Eagles || 2–7 || Tanaka (1–0) || Hoshino (0–1) || — || Kleenex Stadium || 20,189 || 3–4–0 || L1
|-align="center" bgcolor="#ffbbbb"
| 8 || March 30 || @ Eagles || 1–3 || Asai (1–1) || Glynn (0–2) || Aoyama (1) || Kleenex Stadium || 19,518 || 3–5–0 || L2
|-

|-align="center" bgcolor="#bbffbb"
| 9 || April 1 || @ Hawks || 6–0 || Takeda (2–0) || Arakaki (0–1) || — || Yahoo Dome || 29,204 || 4–5–0 || W1
|-align="center" bgcolor="#ffbbbb"
|10 || April 2 || @ Hawks || 0–9 || Otonari (2–0) || Yoshikawa (0–2) || — || Kitakyushu Stadium || 17,721 || 4–6–0 || L1
|-align="center" bgcolor="#bbffbb"
|11 || April 3 || @ Hawks || 6–2 || Darvish (2–0) || Guttormson (0–1) || — || Yahoo Dome || 32,144 || 5–6–0 || W1
|-align="center" bgcolor="#bbffbb"
|12 || April 4 || @ Buffaloes || 3–2 || Sweeney (1–0) || Kamoshida (0–1) || Nakamura (1) || Kyocera Dome || 11,738 || 6–6–0 || W2
|-align="center" bgcolor="#ffbbbb"
|13 || April 5 || @ Buffaloes || 2–7 || Kondo (2–0) || Fujii (0–1) || — || Kyocera Dome || 18,129 || 6–7–0 || L1
|-align="center" bgcolor="#bbffbb"
|14 || April 6 || @ Buffaloes || 3–2 || Glynn (1–2) || Kawagoe (1–1) || Nakamura (2) || Skymark Stadium || 14,111 || 7–7–0 || W1
|-align="center" bgcolor="#bbffbb"
|15 || April 8 || Eagles || 8–7 || Takeda (3–0) || Lin (0–2) || Nakamura (3) || Sapporo Dome || 20,257 || 8–7–0 || W2
|-align="center" bgcolor="#bbffbb"
|16 || April 9 || Eagles || 4–2 || Yoshikawa (1–2) || Nagai (2–1) || Nakamura (4) || Sapporo Dome || 19,044 || 9–7–0 || W3
|-align="center" bgcolor="#bbffbb"
|17 || April 10 || Eagles || 1–0 || Darvish (3–0) || Iwakuma (2–1) || — || Sapporo Dome || 25,197 || 10–7–0 || W4
|-align="center" bgcolor="#bbffbb"
|18 || April 11 || @ Marines || 3–2 || Sweeney (2–0) || Kobayashi (1–2) || Nakamura (5) || Chiba Marine Stadium || 15,161 || 11–7–0 || W5
|-align="center" bgcolor="#ffbbbb"
|19 || April 12 || @ Marines || 1–2 || Naruse (2–1) || Miyanishi (0–1) || — || Chiba Marine Stadium || 27,513 || 11–8–0 || L1
|-align="center" bgcolor="#ffbbbb"
|20 || April 13 || @ Marines || 1–2 (10) || Watanabe (2–1) || Takeda (1–1) || — || Chiba Marine Stadium || 16,282 || 11–9–0 || L2
|-align="center" bgcolor="#ffeeaa"
|21 || April 15 || @ Lions || 3–3 (12) || colspan=3|Game tied after 12 innings || Seibu Dome || 8,397 || 11–9–1 || T1
|-align="center" bgcolor="#ffbbbb"
|22 || April 16 || @ Lions || 2–4 || Wakui (2–2) || Yoshikawa (1–3) || — || Seibu Dome || 11,263 || 11–10–1 || L1
|-align="center" bgcolor="#bbffbb"
|23 || April 18 || Hawks || 3–1 || Darvish (4–0) || Sugiuchi (1–2) || — || Sapporo Dome || 18,107 || 12–10–1 || W1
|-align="center" bgcolor="#bbffbb"
|24 || April 19 || Hawks || 4–2 || Fujii (1–1) || Oba (2–2) || Nakamura (6) || Sapporo Dome || 27,041 || 13–10–1 || W2
|-align="center" bgcolor="#ffbbbb"
|25 || April 20 || Hawks || 2–4 || Wada (1–0) || Glynn (1–3) || Houlton (2) || Sapporo Dome || 30,536 || 13–11–1 || L1
|-align="center" bgcolor="#bbffbb"
|26 || April 22 || Buffaloes || 4–2 || Hoshino (1–1) || Takagi (1–2) || Nakamura (7) || Sapporo Dome || 14,253 || 14–11–1 || W1
|-align="center" bgcolor="#ffbbbb"
|27 || April 23 || Buffaloes || 0–5 || Yamamoto (2–0) || Sweeney (2–1) || — || Sapporo Dome || 14,358 || 14–12–1 || L1
|-align="center" bgcolor="#bbffbb"
|28 || April 24 || Buffaloes || 3–2 (10) || Takeda (2–1) || Kato (0–1) || — || Sapporo Dome || 15,644 || 15–12–1 || W1
|-align="center" bgcolor="#ffbbbb"
|29 || April 25 || @ Eagles || 1–6 || Iwakuma (4–1) || Yoshikawa (1–4) || — || Kleenex Stadium || 13,213 || 15–13–1 || L1
|-align="center" bgcolor="#ffbbbb"
|30 || April 26 || @ Eagles || 0–4 || Guzmán (1–2) || Fujii (1–2) || — || Kleenex Stadium || 16,826 || 15–14–1 || L2
|-align="center" bgcolor="#ffbbbb"
|31 || April 27 || @ Eagles || 0–5 || Tanaka (3–1) || Glynn (1–4) || — || Kleenex Stadium || 20,634 || 15–15–1 || L3
|-align="center" bgcolor="#bbffbb"
|32 || April 29 || @ Marines || 3–2 || Nakamura (1–0) || Sikorski (1–4) || — || Chiba Marine Stadium || 30,021 || 16–15–1 || W1
|-align="center" bgcolor="#bbffbb"
|33 || April 30 || @ Marines || 6–3 || Darvish (5–0) || Watanabe (3–2) || Nakamura (8) || Chiba Marine Stadium || 17,516 || 17–15–1 || W2
|-

|-align="center" bgcolor="#bbffbb"
| 34 || May 1 || @ Marines || 6–1 || Yoshikawa (2–4) || Ono (2–1) || — || Chiba Marine Stadium || 17,143 || 18–15–1 || W3
|-align="center" bgcolor="#bbffbb"
| 35 || May 2 || Eagles || 5–1 || Tadano (1–0) || Iwakuma (4–2) || Nakamura (9) || Sapporo Dome || 41,124 || 19–15–1 || W4
|-align="center" bgcolor="#bbffbb"
| 36 || May 3 || Eagles || 12–5 || Sakamoto (1–1) || Kawagishi (0–1) || — || Sapporo Dome || 40,083 || 20–15–1 || W5
|-align="center" bgcolor="#ffbbbb"
| 37 || May 4 || Eagles || 1–7 || Tanaka (4–1) || Glynn (1–5) || — || Sapporo Dome || 42,126 || 20–16–1 || L1
|-align="center" bgcolor="#ffbbbb"
| 38 || May 5 || @ Lions || 6–8 || Onodera (2–2) || Takeda (2–2) || Graman (8) || Seibu Dome || 34,783 || 20–17–1 || L2
|-align="center" bgcolor="#ffbbbb"
| 39 || May 6 || @ Lions || 1–3 || Ishii (5–1) || Miyanishi (0–2) || — || Seibu Dome || 27,340 || 20–18–1 || L3
|-align="center" bgcolor="#ffbbbb"
| 40 || May 7 || @ Lions || 3–4 || Hoshino (2–0) || Darvish (5–1) || — || Seibu Dome || 15,574 || 20–19–1 || L4
|-align="center" bgcolor="#ffbbbb"
| 41 || May 10 || Hawks || 0–1 || Sugiuchi (3–3) || Fujii (1–3) || — || Ocean Stadium || 16,822 || 20–20–1 || L5
|-align="center" bgcolor="#bbffbb"
| 42 || May 11 || Hawks || 4–3 || Miyanishi (1–2) || Kume (3–1) || Nakamura (10) || Ocean Stadium || 17,919 || 21–20–1 || W1
|-align="center" bgcolor="#ffbbbb"
| 43 || May 13 || Marines || 2–8 || Karakawa (3–0) || Glynn (1–6) || — || Tokyo Dome || 19,828 || 21–21–1 || L1
|-align="center" bgcolor="#bbffbb"
| 44 || May 14 || Marines || 4–3 (11) || Nakamura (2–0) || Ogino (1–3) || — || Tokyo Dome || 22,265 || 22–21–1 || W1
|-align="center" bgcolor="#bbffbb"
| 45 || May 15 || Marines || 6–5 || Tateyama (1–0) || Abreu (1–1) || — || Tokyo Dome || 17,368 || 23–21–1 || W2
|-align="center" bgcolor="#bbffbb"
| 46 || May 16 || @ Hawks || 10–3 || Tadano (2–0) || Otonari (3–5) || — || Yahoo Dome || 30,948 || 24–21–1 || W3
|-align="center" bgcolor="#ffbbbb"
| 47 || May 17 || @ Hawks || 2–3 || Sugiuchi (4–3) || Tateyama (1–1) || — || Yahoo Dome || 30,218 || 24–22–1 || L1
|-align="center" bgcolor="#bbffbb"
| 48 || May 18 || @ Hawks || 4–3 || Sweeney (3–1) || Oba (3–4) || Takeda (1) || Yahoo Dome || 32,494 || 25–22–1 || W1
|-align="center" bgcolor="#bbffbb"
| 49 || May 20 || BayStars || 6–3 || Glynn (2–6) || Nasuno (2–6) || Takeda (2) || Sapporo Dome || 16,957 || 26–22–1 || W2
|-align="center" bgcolor="#bbffbb"
| 50 || May 21 || BayStars || 4–3 || Hoshino (2–1) || Miura (2–5) || Takeda (3) || Sapporo Dome || 20,271 || 27–22–1 || W3
|-align="center" bgcolor="#bbffbb"
| 51 || May 23 || Dragons || 1–0 || Sakamoto (2–1) || Kawakami (2–3) || Takeda (4) || Sapporo Dome || 23,966 || 28–22–1 || W4
|-align="center" bgcolor="#bbffbb"
| 52 || May 24 || Dragons || 11–1 || Sweeney (4–1) || Kawai (1–2) || — || Sapporo Dome || 30,983 || 29–22–1 || W5
|-align="center" bgcolor="#ffbbbb"
| 53 || May 25 || @ Giants || 4–6 || Nishimura (6–2) || Fujii (1–4) || Kroon (15) || Tokyo Dome || 43,813 || 29–23–1 || L1
|-align="center" bgcolor="#ffbbbb"
| 54 || May 26 || @ Giants || 3–4 || Burnside (1–0) || Glynn (2–7) || Kroon (16) || Tokyo Dome || 39,278 || 29–24–1 || L2
|-align="center" bgcolor="#bbffbb"
| 55 || May 28 || @ Swallows || 7–3 || Darvish (6–1) || Muranaka (3–6) || — || Meiji Jingu Stadium || 18,050 || 30–24–1 || W1
|-align="center" bgcolor="#bbffbb"
| 56 || May 29 || @ Swallows || 3–2 || Miyanishi (2–2) || Oshimoto (2–1) || Takeda (5) || Meiji Jingu Stadium || 9,683 || 31–24–1 || W2
|-align="center" bgcolor="#bbffbb"
| 57 || May 31 || Tigers || 2–1 || Sweeney (5–1) || Iwata (5–2) || Takeda (6) || Sapporo Dome || 42,126 || 32–24–1 || W3
|-

|-align="center" bgcolor="#ffbbbb"
| 58 || June 1 || Tigers || 4–5 (10) || Kubota (3–1) || Takeda (2–3) || Fujikawa (18) || Sapporo Dome || 42,126 || 32–25–1 || L1
|-align="center" bgcolor="#bbffbb"
| 59 || June 3 || Carp || 4–2 || Glynn (3–7) || Otake (2–7) || — || Sapporo Dome || 17,815 || 33–25–1 || W1
|-align="center" bgcolor="#ffbbbb"
| 60 || June 4 || Carp || 2–3 || Lewis (8–4) || Darvish (6–2) || Nagakawa (8) || Sapporo Dome || 23,870 || 33–26–1 || L1
|-align="center" bgcolor="#bbffbb"
| 61 || June 6 || @ Dragons || 7–3 || Sakamoto (3–1) || Sato (0–1) || — || Nagoya Dome || 36,725 || 34–26–1 || W1
|-align="center" bgcolor="#ffbbbb"
| 62 || June 7 || @ Dragons || 1–4 || Kawakami (4–3) || Sweeney (5–2) || Iwase (18) || Nagoya Dome || 38,247 || 34–27–1 || L1
|-align="center" bgcolor="#bbffbb"
| 63 || June 8 || @ BayStars || 9–3 || Fujii (2–4) || Nasuno (4–7) || — || Yokohama Stadium || 17,842 || 35–27–1 || W1
|-align="center" bgcolor="#ffbbbb"
| 64 || June 9 || @ BayStars || 3–13 || Oyamada (2–3) || Glynn (3–8) || — || Yokohama Stadium || 9,796 || 35–28–1 || L1
|-align="center" bgcolor="#ffbbbb"
| 65 || June 11 || Giants || 0–1 || Nomaguchi (2–3) || Darvish (6–3) || Kroon (18) || Sapporo Dome || 35,298 || 35–29–1 || L2
|-align="center" bgcolor="#bbffbb"
| 66 || June 12 || Giants || 3–2 || Tadano (3–0) || Burnside (2–1) || Nakamura (11) || Sapporo Dome || 30,135 || 36–29–1 || W1
|-align="center" bgcolor="#bbffbb"
| 67 || June 14 || Swallows || 2–1 (10) || Takeda (3–3) || Lim (1–3) || — || Sapporo Dome || 40,058 || 37–29–1 || W2
|-align="center" bgcolor="#ffbbbb"
| 68 || June 15 || Swallows || 1–3 || Muranaka (4–7) || Glynn (3–9) || Lim (16) || Sapporo Dome || 31,556 || 37–30–1 || L1
|-align="center" bgcolor="#bbffbb"
| 69 || June 17 || @ Carp || 8–7 || Darvish (7–3) || Otake (2–9) || Nakamura (12) || Hiroshima Stadium || 19,860 || 38–30–1 || W1
|-align="center" bgcolor="#ffbbbb"
| 70 || June 18 || @ Carp || 1–2 || Maeda (1–0) || Tadano (3–1) || Nagakawa (12) || Hiroshima Stadium || 18,527 || 38–31–1 || L1
|-align="center" bgcolor="#bbffbb"
| 71 || June 21 || @ Tigers || 4–0 || Sweeney (6–2) || Iwata (5–4) || — || Koshien Stadium || 43,528 || 39–31–1 || W1
|-align="center" bgcolor="#ffbbbb"
| 72 || June 22 || @ Tigers || 3–5 || Atchison (5–4) || Glynn (3–10) || Fujikawa (25) || Koshien Stadium || 43,524 || 39–32–1 || L1
|-align="center" bgcolor="#bbffbb"
| 73 || June 27 || @ Buffaloes || 4–3 || Darvish (8–3) || Kawagoe (1–3) || Nakamura (13) || Kyocera Dome || 14,654 || 40–32–1 || W1
|-align="center" bgcolor="#ffbbbb"
| 74 || June 28 || @ Buffaloes || 1–5 || Kaneko (3–6) || Tadano (3–2) || — || Kyocera Dome || 16,809 || 40–33–1 || L1
|-align="center" bgcolor="#bbffbb"
| 75 || June 29 || @ Buffaloes || 9–4 || Takeda (4–0) || Kondo (5–7) || Tateyama (1) || Kyocera Dome || 18,153 || 41–33–1 || W1
|-

|-align="center" bgcolor="#ffbbbb"
| 76 || July 1 || Lions || 7–12 || Onodera (3–4) || Miyanishi (2–3) || — ||| Sapporo Dome || 22,125 || 41–34–1 || L1
|-align="center" bgcolor="#ffbbbb"
| 77 || July 2 || Lions || 6–8 || Wakui (7–6) || Glynn (3–11) || Graman (15) || Sapporo Dome || 17,682 || 41–35–1 || L2
|-align="center" bgcolor="#bbffbb"
| 78 || July 3 || Lions || 6–4 || Darvish (9–3) || Hoashi (7–2) || Nakamura (14) || Sapporo Dome || 24,420 || 42–35–1 || W1
|-align="center" bgcolor="#bbffbb"
| 79 || July 5 || Buffaloes || 4–3 || Tadano (4–2) || Ortiz (3–5) || Nakamura (15) || Kushiro Stadium || 17,892 || 43–35–1 || W2
|-align="center" bgcolor="#ffbbbb"
| 80 || July 6 || Buffaloes || 5–8 || Kaneko (4–6) || Takeda (4–1) || Kato (17) || Obihiro Stadium || 21,063 || 43–36–1 || L1
|-align="center" bgcolor="#ffbbbb"
| 81 || July 8 || @ Marines || 2–5 || Shimizu (7–6) || Sweeney (6–3) || — || Chiba Marine Stadium || 18,562 || 43–37–1 || L2
|-align="center" bgcolor="#ffbbbb"
| 82 || July 9 || @ Marines || 5–7 || Kawasaki (1–3) || Glynn (3–12) || Ogino (11) || Chiba Marine Stadium || 28,198 || 43–38–1 || L3
|-align="center" bgcolor="#bbffbb"
| 83 || July 11 || Hawks || 3–2 || Darvish (10–3) || Otonari (7–7) || — || Sapporo Dome || 22,712 || 44–38–1 || W1
|-align="center" bgcolor="#bbffbb"
| 84 || July 12 || Hawks || 9–6 || Tadano (5–2) || Oba (3–5) || Nakamura (16) || Sapporo Dome || 31,882 || 45–38–1 || W2
|-align="center" bgcolor="#ffbbbb"
| 85 || July 13 || Hawks || 1–10 || Wada (8–3) || Takeda (4–2) || — || Sapporo Dome || 32,127 || 45–39–1 || L1
|-align="center" bgcolor="#ffeeaa"
| 86 || July 15 || Eagles || 4–4 (12) || colspan=3|Game tied after 12 innings || Tokyo Dome || 16,186 || 45–39–2 || T1
|-align="center" bgcolor="#ffbbbb"
| 87 || July 16 || Eagles || 2–5 || Katayama (2–1) || Miyanishi (2–4) || Kawagishi (2) || Tokyo Dome || 16,249 || 45–40–2 || L1
|-align="center" bgcolor="#bbffbb"
| 88 || July 17 || Eagles || 3–1 || Darvish (11–3) || Guzmán (2–5) || — || Tokyo Dome || 20,773 || 46–40–2 || W1
|-align="center" bgcolor="#ffbbbb"
| 89 || July 19 || @ Buffaloes || 2–6 || Yamamoto (7–2) || Tadano (5–3) || — || Skymark Stadium || 20,016 || 46–41–2 || L1
|-align="center" bgcolor="#ffbbbb"
| 90 || July 20 || @ Buffaloes || 1–4 || Kaneko (6–6) || Takeda (4–3) || Kato (20) || Kyocera Dome || 16,068 || 46–42–2 || L2
|-align="center" bgcolor="#bbffbb"
| 91 || July 22 || Marines || 3–2 || Sweeney (7–3) || Kobayashi (2–9) || Nakamura (17) || Sapporo Dome || 25,845 || 47–42–2 || W1
|-align="center" bgcolor="#ffbbbb"
| 92 || July 23 || Marines || 2–3 || Shimizu (8–6) || Fujii (2–5) || Ogino (14) || Sapporo Dome || 26,902 || 47–43–2 || L1
|-align="center" bgcolor="#ffbbbb"
| 93 || July 24 || Marines || 2–5 || Omine (1–2) || Darvish (11–4) || Ogino (15) || Sapporo Dome || 27,825 || 47–44–2 || L2
|-align="center" bgcolor="#bbffbb"
| 94 || July 25 || Lions || 2–1 || Tadano (6–3) || Hoashi (9–3) || Nakamura (18) || Sapporo Dome || 23,323 || 48–44–2 || W1
|-align="center" bgcolor="#ffbbbb"
| 95 || July 26 || Lions || 3–6 || Iwasaki (2–0) || Kanamori (0–1) || Graman (20) || Sapporo Dome || 33,538 || 48–45–2 || L1
|-align="center" bgcolor="#ffbbbb"
| 96 || July 27 || Lions || 2–3 (10) || Graman (2–2) || Takeda (3–4) || — || Sapporo Dome || 36,064 || 48–46–2 || L2
|-align="center" bgcolor="#bbffbb"
| 97 || July 28 || @ Hawks || 10–2 || Takeda (5–3) || Powell (1–5) || — || Yahoo Dome || 34,222 || 49–46–2 || W1
|-align="center" bgcolor="#bbffbb"
| 98 || July 29 || @ Hawks || 5–2 || Sweeney (8–3) || Yang (1–2) || Nakamura (19) || Yahoo Dome || 32,653 || 50–46–2 || W2
|- align="center"
|colspan="11" bgcolor="#bbffff"|All-Star Break: CL and PL split series, 1–1
|-

|-align="center" bgcolor="#ffbbbb"
| 99 || August 3 || @ Eagles || 4–11 || Asai (7–7) || Tadano (6–4) || — || Kleenex Stadium || 20,516 || 50–47–2 || L1
|-align="center" bgcolor="#bbffbb"
| 100 || August 4 || @ Eagles || 6–2 || Takeda (6–3) || Aoyama (2–5) || — || Kleenex Stadium || 18,760 || 51–47–2 || W1
|-align="center" bgcolor="#bbffbb"
| 101 || August 5 || @ Eagles || 7–2 || Sweeney (9–3) || Guzmán (2–7) || — || Kleenex Stadium || 17,942 || 52–47–2 || W2
|-align="center" bgcolor="#ffbbbb"
| 102 || August 10 || @ Lions || 2–11 || Hoashi (10–3) || Tadano (6–5) || — || Seibu Dome || 30,024 || 52–48–2 || L1
|-align="center" bgcolor="#ffbbbb"
| 103 || August 11 || @ Lions || 0–3 || Kishi (9–4) || Takeda (6–4) || Graman (22) || Seibu Dome || 19,260 || 52–49–2 || L2
|-align="center" bgcolor="#ffbbbb"
| 104 || August 12 || @ Lions || 4–8 || Onodera (4–4) || Takeda (3–5) || — || Seibu Dome || 19,055 || 52–50–2 || L3
|-align="center" bgcolor="#ffbbbb"
| 105 || August 13 || Buffaloes || 2–4 || Komatsu (9–3) || Glynn (3–13) || Kato (24) || Sapporo Dome || 24,416 || 52–51–2 || L4
|-align="center" bgcolor="#ffbbbb"
| 106 || August 14 || Buffaloes || 0–2 (11) || Kato (2–3) || Takeda (3–6) || Shimizu (1) || Sapporo Dome || 22,476 || 52–52–2 || L5
|-align="center" bgcolor="#ffbbbb"
| 107 || August 15 || Buffaloes || 3–5 (10) || Kawagoe (2–3) || Nakamura (2–1) || Kato (25) || Sapporo Dome || 22,829 || 52–53–2 || L6
|-align="center" bgcolor="#bbffbb"
| 108 || August 16 || @ Hawks || 5–1 || Yagi (1–0) || Standridge (0–2) || — || Yahoo Dome || 33,687 || 53–53–2 || W1
|-align="center" bgcolor="#ffbbbb"
| 109 || August 17 || @ Hawks || 1–2 || Otonari (11–8) || Takeda (6–5) || Mahara (5) || Yahoo Dome || 33,533 || 53–54–2 || L1
|-align="center" bgcolor="#bbffbb"
| 110 || August 18 || @ Hawks || 7–0 || Sweeney (10–3) || Hoshino (0–1) || — || Yahoo Dome || 30,636 || 54–54–2 || W1
|-align="center" bgcolor="#bbffbb"
| 111 || August 19 || Marines || 4–0 || Glynn (4–13) || Kobayashi (3–11) || — || Tokyo Dome || 20,061 || 55–54–2 || W2
|-align="center" bgcolor="#ffbbbb"
| 112 || August 20 || Marines || 3–6 || Shimizu (9–8) || Fujii (2–6) || Ogino (20) || Tokyo Dome || 21,034 || 55–55–2 || L1
|-align="center" bgcolor="#bbffbb"
| 113 || August 24 || Lions || 9–3 || Tadano (7–5) || Hoashi (10–4) || — || Starffin Stadium || 22,583 || 56–55–2 || W1
|-align="center" bgcolor="#ffbbbb"
| 114 || August 25 || Lions || 3–4 || Onodera (5–4) || Takeda (3–7) || Graman (23) || Sapporo Dome || 21,840 || 56–56–2 || L1
|-align="center" bgcolor="#bbffbb"
| 115 || August 26 || @ Marines || 3–2 || Sweeney (11–3) || Watanabe (11–5) || Nakamura (20) || Chiba Marine Stadium || 20,764 || 57–56–2 || W1
|-align="center" bgcolor="#bbffbb"
| 116 || August 27 || @ Marines || 1–0 || Glynn (5–13) || Kubo (2–6) || Nakamura (21) || Chiba Marine Stadium || 22,038 || 58–56–2 || W2
|-align="center" bgcolor="#ffbbbb"
| 117 || August 28 || @ Marines || 0–3 || Shimizu (10–8) || Fujii (2–7) || — || Chiba Marine Stadium || 16,522 || 58–57–2 || L1
|-align="center" bgcolor="#ffbbbb"
| 118 || August 29 || @ Buffaloes || 4–7 || Kishida (2–0) || Kanazawa (0–1) || Kato (29) || Skymark Stadium || 20,279 || 58–58–2 || L2
|-align="center" bgcolor="#ffbbbb"
| 119 || August 30 || @ Buffaloes || 2–7 || Yamamoto (9–4) || Yagi (1–1) || — || Kyocera Dome || 18,169 || 58–59–2 || L3
|-align="center" bgcolor="#ffbbbb"
| 120 || August 31 || @ Buffaloes || 1–5 || Kaneko (9–8) || Tadano (7–6) || — || Kyocera Dome || 18,033 || 58–60–2 || L4
|-

|-align="center" bgcolor="#bbffbb"
| 121 || September 2 || Hawks || 2–0 || Darvish (12–4) || Guttormson (4–5) || Nakamura (22) || Sapporo Dome || 20,118 || 59–60–2 || W1
|-align="center" bgcolor="#ffbbbb"
| 122 || September 3 || Hawks || 3–4 || Sato (3–1) || Takeda (6–6) || Mahara (7) || Sapporo Dome || 17,702 || 59–61–2 || L1
|-align="center" bgcolor="#bbffbb"
| 123 || September 4 || Hawks || 4–3 || Takeda (4–7) || Sato (3–2) || — || Sapporo Dome || 16,975 || 60–61–2 || W1
|-align="center" bgcolor="#ffbbbb"
| 124 || September 5 || Eagles || 3–5 (10) || Gwyn (1–0) || Nakamura (2–2) || — || Sapporo Dome || 22,692 || 60–62–2 || L1
|-align="center" bgcolor="#bbffbb"
| 125 || September 6 || Eagles || 4–1 || Fujii (3–7) || Katayama (2–5) || Nakamura (23) || Sapporo Dome || 33,197 || 61–62–2 || W1
|-align="center" bgcolor="#ffbbbb"
| 126 || September 7 || Eagles || 2–5 || Satake (1–0) || Tadano (7–7) || Arime (2) || Sapporo Dome || 33,224 || 61–63–2 || L1
|-align="center" bgcolor="#bbffbb"
| 127 || September 9 || @ Lions || 4–1 || Darvish (13–4) || Ishii (10–9) || Nakamura (24) || Seibu Dome || 14,554 || 62–63–2 || W1
|-align="center" bgcolor="#bbffbb"
| 128 || September 10 || @ Lions || 6–5 || Sakamoto (4–1) || Nishiguchi (8–6) || Nakamura (25) || Seibu Dome || 14,292 || 63–63–2 || W2
|-align="center" bgcolor="#ffbbbb"
| 129 || September 11 || @ Lions || 3–5 || Wakui (9–9) || Sweeney (11–4) || Graman (27) || Seibu Dome || 14,016 || 63–64–2 || L1
|-align="center" bgcolor="#bbffbb"
| 130 || September 13 || Buffaloes || 7–4 || Glynn (6–13) || Yamamoto (9–6) || Nakamura (26) || Sapporo Dome || 25,074 || 64–64–2 || W1
|-align="center" bgcolor="#bbffbb"
| 131 || September 14 || Buffaloes || 9–6 || Sakamoto (5–1) || Kaneko (10–9) || Nakamura (27) || Sapporo Dome || 30,457 || 65–64–2 || W2
|-align="center" bgcolor="#bbffbb"
| 132 || September 15 || Buffaloes || 5–4 || Darvish (14–4) || Kato (2–4) || — || Sapporo Dome || 31,473 || 66–64–2 || W3
|-align="center" bgcolor="#ffbbbb"
| 133 || September 16 || @ Eagles || 1–6 || Iwakuma (19–3) || Takeda (6–7) || — || Kleenex Stadium || 11,966 || 66–65–2 || L1
|-align="center" bgcolor="#ffbbbb"
| 134 || September 17 || @ Eagles || 7–15 || Asai (9–10) || Sweeney (11–5) || — || Kleenex Stadium || 12,430 || 66–66–2 || L2
|-align="center" bgcolor="#ffbbbb"
| 135 || September 18 || @ Eagles || 2–5 || Tanaka (8–6) || Fujii (3–8) || — || Kleenex Stadium || 13,697 || 66–67–2 || L3
|-align="center" bgcolor="#ffbbbb"
| 136 || September 20 || @ Buffaloes || 1–6 || Yamamoto (10–6) || Glynn (6–14) || — || Kyocera Dome || 20,222 || 66–68–2 || L4
|-align="center" bgcolor="#bbffbb"
| 137 || September 21 || @ Buffaloes || 10–5 || Sakamoto (6–1) || Motoyanagi (2–7) || — || Kyocera Dome || 25,036 || 67–68–2 || W1
|-align="center" bgcolor="#bbffbb"
| 138 || September 22 || @ Hawks || 9–0 || Darvish (15–4) || Arakaki (2–6) || — || Yahoo Dome || 30,491 || 68–68–2 || W2
|-align="center" bgcolor="#bbffbb"
| 139 || September 23 || @ Hawks || 5–2 || Takeda (7–7) || Sugiuchi (10–7) || — || Yahoo Dome || 30,278 || 69–68–2 || W3
|-align="center" bgcolor="#bbffbb"
| 140 || September 26 || Lions || 2–0 || Sweeney (12–5) || Hoashi (11–6) || Tateyama (2) || Sapporo Dome || 28,331 || 70–68–2 || W4
|-align="center" bgcolor="#bbffbb"
| 141 || September 27 || Lions || 5–4 || Glynn (7–14) || Hsu (1–3) || Nakamura (28) || Sapporo Dome || 35,460 || 71–68–2 || W5
|-align="center" bgcolor="#ffbbbb"
| 142 || September 28 || Marines || 1–4 || Naruse (8–6) || Tateyama (1–2) || Ogino (29) || Sapporo Dome || 42,126 || 71–69–2 || L1
|-align="center" bgcolor="#bbffbb"
| 143 || September 29 || Marines || 2–1 || Darvish (16–4) || Kobayashi (5–12) || — || Sapporo Dome || 42,126 || 72–69–2 || W1
|-

|-align="center" bgcolor="#bbffbb"
| 144 || October 1 || @ Eagles || 17–0 || Takeda (8–7) || Tanaka (9–7) || — || Kleenex Stadium || 14,953 || 73–69–2 || W2
|-

|-
| Legend:       = Win       = Loss       = Tie       = PostponementBold = Fighters team member

Postseason

Climax Series

Game log

|-align="center" bgcolor="#bbffbb"
| 1 || October 11 || @ Buffaloes || 4–1 || Darvish (1–0) || Kondo (0–1) || — || Kyocera Dome || 25,532 || 1–0–0 || W1
|-align="center" bgcolor="#bbffbb"
| 2 || October 12 || @ Buffaloes|| 7–2 || Fujii (1–0) || Komatsu (0–1) || — || Kyocera Dome || 26,703 || 2–0–0 || W2
|-

|-align="center" bgcolor="#ffbbbb"
| 1 || October 17 || @ Lions || 3–10 || Wakui (1–0) || Glynn (0–1) || — || Omiya Park Stadium || 20,500 || 0–1–0 || L1
|-align="center" bgcolor="#bbffbb"
| 2 || October 18 || @ Lions|| 5–0 || Darvish (1–0) || Kishi (0–1) || — || Seibu Dome || 30,918 || 1–1–0 || W1
|-align="center" bgcolor="#bbffbb"
| 3 || October 19 || @ Lions || 7–4 || Takeda (1–0) || Hoashi (0–1) || — || Seibu Dome || 33,078 || 2–1–0 || W2
|-align="center" bgcolor="#ffbbbb"
| 4 || October 21 || @ Lions || 4–9 || Ishii (1–0) || Sweeney (0–1) || — || Seibu Dome || 18,704 || 2–2–0 || L1
|-align="center" bgcolor="#ffbbbb"
| 5 || October 22 || @ Lions || 0–9 || Wakui (2–0) || Glynn (0–2) || — || Seibu Dome || 21,731 || 2–3–0 || L2
|-

|-
| Legend:       = Win       = Loss       = Tie       = PostponementBold = Fighters team member

Roster

Player statistics

Batting 

†Denotes player joined the team mid-season. Stats reflect time with the Fighters only.
‡Denotes player left the team mid-season. Stats reflect time with the Fighters only.
Bold/italics denotes best in the league

Pitching 

†Denotes player spent time with another team before joining the Eagles. Stats reflect time with the Eagles only.
‡Denotes player was traded mid-season. Stats reflect time with the Eagles only.
Bold/italics denotes best in the league

Awards
Nippon Life Monthly MVP Award
 Yu Darvish - March/April, September (pitcher)

Best Nine Award
 Atsunori Inaba - outfielder

Mitsui Golden Glove Award
 Yu Darvish - pitcher
 Kensuke Tanaka - second baseman
 Atsunori Inaba - outfielder
 Hichori Morimoto - outfielder

All-Star Series selections
 Masataka Nashida - manager
 Yu Darvish - starting pitcher
 Hisashi Takeda - relief pitcher
 Kensuke Tanaka - second baseman
 Atsunori Inaba - outfielder
 Hichori Morimoto - outfielder

Farm team

Nippon Professional Baseball draft

References

Hokkaido Nippon-Ham Fighters
Hokkaido Nippon-Ham Fighters seasons